Springdale may refer to:

Australia
 Springdale, New South Wales
Springdale, Queensland, a locality in the Southern Downs Region

Canada
 Springdale Caldera
 Springdale, Alberta
 Springdale, Brampton
 Springdale, Newfoundland and Labrador
 Springdale Airport

United States
 Springdale, Arkansas
 Springdale Public Schools
 Springdale High School
 Springdale (Stamford), Connecticut
 Springdale (Metro-North station)
 Springdale, Idaho
 Springdale, Iowa
 Springdale, Kansas
 Springdale, Louisville, Kentucky
 Springdale, Maryland
 Springdale, Holyoke, Massachusetts
 Springdale, Mississippi
 Springdale, Montana
 Springdale, New Jersey
 Springdale, Sussex County, New Jersey
 Springdale, North Carolina
 Springdale, Ohio
 Springdale, Oregon
 Springdale, Pennsylvania
 Springdale, Lancaster County, South Carolina
 Springdale, Lexington County, South Carolina
 Springdale, Utah
 Springdale, Washington
 Springdale, Wisconsin, a town
 Springdale, Buffalo County, Wisconsin, a ghost town
 Springdale Township, Michigan
 Springdale Township, Redwood County, Minnesota
 Springdale Township, Valley County, Nebraska
 Springdale Township, Allegheny County, Pennsylvania
 Springdale Lake, a lake in Georgia
 Springdale Mall, in Mobile, Alabama
 Spring Dale, West Virginia

On the National Register of Historic Places
 Old Springdale High School, in Springdale, Arkansas
 Springdale (Princeton), New Jersey, official residence of the president of the Princeton Theological Seminary, in the Princeton Historic District
 Springdale (Tiffin, Ohio), listed on the National Register of Historic Places in Seneca County, Ohio
 Springdale (Crozier, Virginia), a home in Goochland County
 Spring Dale (Dublin, Virginia), also known as Springdale, a house
 Springdale (Frederick County, Virginia), a farm property
 Springdale (Lexington, Virginia), a house
 Springdale (Mathews, Virginia), a plantation house
 John Hite House, also known as Springdale, near Bartonsville, Frederick County, Virginia
 Springdale Cemetery, a cemetery in Peoria, Illinois
 Springdale Historic District (disambiguation), two NRHP-listed areas in Pennsylvania
 Springdale Mill Complex, near Bartonsville, Frederick County, Virginia
 Springdale Mills, a grist mill in Washington Township, Franklin County, Pennsylvania
 Springdale School, in Springdale, Oregon

Other
 Springdale, code name of several Intel Pentium 4 chipsets

See also
 Springdale Farm (disambiguation)
 Springdale Township (disambiguation)